Barrande is a French surname, and it may refer to
 Joachim Barrande (1799, Saugues 1883, Frohsdorf, Lanzenkirchen), a French-Czech geologist and palaeontologist
 5958 Barrande, a main-belt asteroid named after Joachim Barrande
 
 Barrandov

French-language surnames